StarDrive is a 4X real-time strategy video game by Zero Sum Games, it was released for Microsoft Windows in April 2013. The game was funded through Kickstarter, raising $17,676 in its December 2011 crowdfunding campaign. The player's goal is to dominate the galaxy with one of the eight races through diplomacy and war while developing new technologies, exploring new star systems and colonizing new planets.  The game received a mixed critical reception, generating a score of 61/100 on reviews aggregation website Metacritic.  Its sequel, StarDrive 2 contrastingly adopts turn-based strategy gameplay and was released in April 2015.

References

External links 
 

2013 video games
4X video games
Kickstarter-funded video games
Science fiction video games
Video games developed in the United States
Windows games
Windows-only games
Iceberg Interactive games